Carmen Salinas Lozano (5 October 1939 – 9 December 2021) was a Mexican actress, impressionist, comedian, politician, and theatre entrepreneur. She was associated with the Institutional Revolutionary Party (PRI) during her later career as a politician.

She appeared in 115 films, 70 theater works, 23 telenovelas, and 9 television series.

Life
Salinas was born in 1939, the daughter of Jorge Perez Tejada Salinas and Carmen Lozano Viramontes. She made her television debut in 1964 under the direction of Ernesto Alonso, appearing in such shows as La vecindad (The Neighborhood), La frontera (The Border) and El chofer (The Chauffeur). She also appeared in plays, more than 110 movies, and 30 plus television shows,. She worked alongside actors and producers including Denzel Washington (in Man on Fire) and Juan Osorio. Salinas' other successful projects included her touring musical Aventurera.

In 1956, Salinas and Pedro Plascencia had a son, Pedro Plascencia Salinas. He composed music, including notable compositions for the Necaxa soccer club, and for Televisa's newscasts Noticias ECO and 24 Horas. Plascencia Salinas died of cancer on 19 April 1994.

On 11 November 2021, Salinas suffered a cerebral hemorrhage, brought upon by hypertension, which caused her to lapse into a coma. Salinas never regained consciousness and died on 9 December 2021, at the age of 82 in Mexico City.

Political and legislative career 

In an interview conducted with El Universal in March 2015, Salinas declared that she "had been a priísta ever since [she] had the use of reason".

In 2015, the PRI placed Salinas on its proportional representation list for election from the fourth electoral region, winning her a seat in the Chamber of Deputies for the LXIII Legislature of the Mexican Congress; Salinas served on the Gender Equality, Radio and Television, and Health Commissions. Salinas, who only completed primary school, had the lowest educational level of all the deputies in the legislature.

Filmography

Film

Television

Awards and nominations

References

External links

1939 births
2021 deaths
Mexican telenovela actresses
Mexican television actresses
Mexican film actresses
Mexican stage actresses
Actresses from Coahuila
20th-century Mexican actresses
21st-century Mexican actresses
People from Torreón
Mexican actor-politicians
21st-century Mexican politicians
21st-century Mexican women politicians
Members of the Chamber of Deputies (Mexico)
Women members of the Chamber of Deputies (Mexico)
Institutional Revolutionary Party politicians
Deputies of the LXIII Legislature of Mexico